Mirny is a town located in the Moiynkum District, Zhambyl Region, Kazakhstan. Since 2013 it is part of Khantau rural district (КАТО code — 315641100).

Demographics 
According to the 2009 Kazakhstan census, the town has a population of 1824 people (878 men and 946 women).

As of 1999, the town had a population of 841 (400 men and 441 women).

Geography

References

Populated places in Jambyl Region